Pikiqucha (Quechua piki flea, qucha lake, "flea lake",  hispanicized spellings Piquecocha, Piquicocha) is a lake in Peru. It is situated in the Lima Region, Yauyos Province, Vitis District, south of Vitis.

See also
List of lakes in Peru

References

Lakes of Peru
Lakes of Lima Region